Karl von den Steinen (born March 7, 1855 in Mülheim, died November 4, 1929 in Kronberg im Taunus) was a German physician (with emphasis in psychiatry), ethnologist, explorer, and author of important anthropological work, which is particularly to the study of Indian cultures of Central Brazil, and the art of the Marquesas. He laid the permanent foundations for Brazilian ethnology.

Exploration
 1879-1881: A journey around the earth
 1882-1883: First German International Polar Year Expedition to South Georgia
 1884: The first expedition to the Xingu River region of Brazil (see Xingu Indigenous Park)
 1887-1888: Second Expedition into the Xingú region (Brazil)
 1897-1898: expedition to the South Sea Islands (Marquesas)

Works
 Durch Central-Brasilien: Expedition zur Erforschung des Schingú im J. 1884 (Through Central-Brazil: expedition to explore the Xingú in the year 1884). Brockhaus, Leipzig 1886; Reprint: Fines Mundi, Saarbrücken 2006 
 Die Bakaïrí-Sprache: Wörterverzeichnis, Sätze, Sagen, Grammatik; mit Beiträgen zu einer Lautlehre der karaïbischen Grundsprache (The Bakairi language: vocabulary, sentences, stories, grammar, phonetics, with contributions to a basic language of the Caribs). Koehler, Leipzig 1892 
 Unter den Naturvölkern Zentral-Brasiliens (Among the primitive peoples of Central Brazil) Reiseschilderungen und Ergebnisse der zweiten Schingú-Expedition 1887–1888 (Travel accounts and results of the second Schingú Expedition 1887-1888). Geographic Verlagsbuchhandlung von Dietrich Reimer, Berlin 1894, Reprint: Fines Mundi, Saarbrücken 2006
 Die Marquesaner und ihre Kunst: Studien über die Entwicklung primitiver Südseeornamentik nach eigenen Reiseergebnissen und dem Material der Museen (The Marquesas and their Art: studies on the evolution of primitive Südseeornamentik results according to travel and material of the museums), 3 volumes, Reimer, Berlin 1925–1928; Reprint: NY 1969; Reprint: Fines Mundi, Saarbrücken 2006
 Volume 1 Tattooing: a history of the island group and a comparative introduction to the Polynesian custom, 1925
 Volume 2 Plastic: with an introduction on "Material Culture" and an appendix "Ethnographic additions, 1928
 Volume 3, The library, 1928

See also
 Marquesan Dog

External links
 
Erland Nordenskjöld: Nécrologie de Karl von den Steinen. in Journal de la Société des Américanistes, 1930, Numero 22-1, Page 220-227, on persee.fr
 Fines Mundi - publisher of reprints
Adorning the world: art of the Marquesas Islands, an exhibition catalog from The Metropolitan Museum of Art (fully available online as PDF), which contains material on Karl von den Steinen

1855 births
1929 deaths
People from Mülheim
German psychiatrists
German ethnologists
German explorers
German anthropologists
Explorers of Amazonia